Strike Back was the third album released by German heavy metal band Steeler and produced by Frank Bornemann. Strike Back was released by SPV/Steamhammer in 1986.

Track listing
All music by Peter Burtz, Tom Eder, Axel Rudi Pell. All Lyrics by Peter Burtz, except "Money Doesn't Count" by Burtz, Ric Browde

 "Chain Gang" - 3:27
 "Money Doesn't Count" - 4:43
 "Danger Comeback" - 3:42
 "Icecold" - 3:59
 "Messin' Around with Fire" - 4:06
 "Rockin' the City" - 3:50
 "Strike Back" - 3:58
 "Night After Night" - 4:58
 "Waiting for a Star" - 4:38

Credits
 Peter Burtz - vocals
 Axel Rudi Pell - lead guitar
 Tom Eder - lead guitar
 Roland Hag - bass guitar
 Jan Yildiral - drums

References

1986 albums
Steeler (German band) albums
SPV/Steamhammer albums